This is a list of election results for the electoral district of Walsh in South Australian elections.

Members for Walsh

Election results

Elections in the 1980s

References

South Australian state electoral results by district